Licab, officially the Municipality of Licab, is a 4th-class municipality in the province of Nueva Ecija, Philippines. According to the 2020 census, it has a population of 29,269 people.

History
Licab is a former sitio under the municipality of Aliaga and was known as "Pulong Samat". A wooded area surrounded by rivers and streams, it was then inhabited by thirty families consisting of Ilocanos, Kapampangan and Tagalog, until the Esguerra brothers arrived and lived with the locals.

Don Dalmacio, one of the Esguerra brothers, led the clearing of the vast grasslands and brushwood with his brothers and the locals, subsequently cultivating the area with a bountiful harvest.

Due to the increase in the population of Pulong Samat, Dalmacio directed the establishment of a "gunglo" which served as Pulong Samat's council or government. The aforementioned council began to change the name of Pulong Samat and later used "Licab" which came from the ilocano saying "kaskada agliklikab ti ani ti pagay da" which means "the collected rice is flowing", the word likab is the Ilocano term of "flowing".

In 1882, led by Don Dalmacio, the local heads of the barrios of Santa Maria, Licab, Bantog and neighboring sitios, presented a petition to the civil administration of the Spanish government in the Philippines for the establishment of a separate municipality from the municipality of Aliaga.

After more than ten years, having fulfilled the requirements prescribed by the leaders of the Spanish government in the Philippines, the order to establish the municipality of Licab was adopted under the leadership of the governor general Ramón Blanco and took into effect on March 28, 1894.

Geography

Barangays
Licab is politically subdivided into 11 barangays.

Climate

Demographics

Economy 

Agriculture has remained the prime industry of the municipality.  Agricultural lands devoted to various agricultural activities cover about tens of thousands hectares out of the total provincial area of 550,718 hectares. Rice is still the prime crop of agricultural development and programs.  Palay production in the town is boosted by a large network of irrigation facilities and other appurtenant structure.

Live stock production of piggery and poultry were the second agricultural income source in this municipality. Most of the residence were considered to be backyard raisers. Meat products sold in the public market were produced and raised locally.

Notable personalities
Vic Manuel, basketball player

References

External links

 [ Philippine Standard Geographic Code]
Philippine Census Information
Local Governance Performance Management System

Municipalities of Nueva Ecija